The 2002–03 Egyptian Premier League was the forty-sixth season of the Egyptian Premier League since its establishment in 1948. The season began on 23 September 2002 and concluded on 23 May 2003, with a total of 14 teams contesting the league. Zamalek won the title, with Al Ahly being the runner up.

League table

References

0
Premier
2002–03 in African association football leagues